Mughan is a village and municipality in Hajigabul District of Azerbaijan. Mughan is the most populous municipality of the district except for the capital Hajiqabul. It has a population of 4,668.

References

External links 

Populated places in Hajigabul District